Homebrew is an album released by Steve Howe in 1996. It is part of the Homebrew series.
The album features new songs as well as re-arranged old songs from Steve's career. He is the only musician as the tracks are mainly demos.

Track listings

References

Steve Howe (musician) albums
1996 albums
Inside Out Music albums